Al Sarrantonio (born May 25, 1952) is an American horror and science fiction writer, editor and publisher who has authored more than 50 books and 90 short stories. He has also edited numerous anthologies and has been called "brilliant" and "a master anthologist" by Booklist.

Background and education
Sarrantonio was born in New York City and grew up on Long Island. He is of Italian and Scots-Irish descent.  He began his career at the age of 16 with a nonfiction appearance in one of editor Ray Palmer's publications. He continued to write throughout university, and in 1974, after graduation from Manhattan College with a B.A. in English, he attended the Clarion Science Fiction Writers Workshop at Michigan State University.

Career
In 1976 Sarrantonio began an editing career at a major New York publishing house. His first short fiction, "Ahead of the Joneses," appeared in Isaac Asimov's Science Fiction Magazine in 1979, followed by a story in Heavy Metal magazine the following year. In 1980 he published 14 short stories. In 1982, after leaving publishing to become a full-time writer, he began his first novel, The Worms, followed by Campbell Wood, Totentanz and The Boy with Penny Eyes. He established himself in the horror field with such much-anthologized stories as "Pumpkin Head", "The Man With Legs", "Father Dear," "Wish", and "Richard's Head," (all of which appear in his first short story collection, Toybox). "Richard's Head" brought him his first Bram Stoker Award nomination.

Sarrantonio is writing a horror saga revolving around Halloween, which takes place in the fictional upstate New York town of Orangefield (novels: Halloweenland, Hallows Eve and Horrorween, the last of which incorporates three shorter Orangefield pieces: the short novel Orangefield, and novelettes
Hornets and The Pumpkin Boy). Other horror novels include Moonbane, October, House Haunted and Skeletons. He has also written Westerns (West Texas and Kitt Peak), mysteries (Cold Night and Summer Cool) and science fiction (the Edgar Rice Burroughs-inflected trilogy Haydn of Mars, Sebastian of Mars and Queen of Mars, omnibused as Masters of Mars by the Science Fiction Book Club, 2006).

Sarrantonio was book reviewer for Night Cry magazine, the short-lived digest-sized offshoot of the Twilight Zone Magazine, and has been a critic and columnist for other publications.

Select awards and honors
Winner:
 2000: Bram Stoker Award – 999: New Stories of Horror and Suspense
 2011: Audie Award - Stories (with Neil Gaiman)
 2011: Shirley Jackson Award - Stories (with Neil Gaiman)

Nominated:
 2011: World Fantasy Award - Stories (with Neil Gaiman)
 2002: Locus Award – Best Editor
 2000: International Horror Guild Award - Toybox
 2000: World Fantasy Award – 999: New Stories of Horror and Suspense
 2000: British Fantasy Award - 999: New Stories of Horror and Suspense
 1991: Bram Stoker Award - "Richard's Head"
 1990: Shamus Award - Cold Night

Select bibliography

Novels
 Underground (Crossroad Press, 2013, e-book)
 Sisters in Mystery (Crossroad Press, 2012, e-book) 
 Summer Cool (Walker, 1993; Crossroad Press, 2011, e-book)
 Kitt Peak (Evans, 1993; Leisure, 2006; Crossroad Press, 2011, e-book)
 Skeletons (Bantam, 1992; Crossroad Press, 2011, e-book)
 House Haunted (Bantam, 1991; Crossroad Press, 2011, e-book)
 West Texas (Evans, 1990; Leisure, 2006; Crossroad Press, 2011, e-book)
 October (Bantam, 1990; Crossroad Press, 2011, e-book)
 Moonbane (Bantam, 1989, paperback; Cemetery Dance, 2009; Crossroad Press, 2011, e-book)
 Cold Night (TOR, 1989; Crossroad Press, 2011, e-book)
 The Boy with Penny Eyes (TOR, 1987; Crossroad Press, 2011, e-book)
 Totentanz (TOR, 1985; Crossroad Press, 2011, e-book)
 Campbell Wood (Doubleday, 1986; Berkley, 1987; Crossroad Press, 2011, e-book)
 The Worms (Doubleday, 1985; Berkley, 1988; Crossroad Press, 2011, e-book)

The Orangefield Cycle
 "Orange Lake" (novelette), Impossible Monsters, edited by Kasey Lansdale (Subterranean Press, 2013; Crossroad Press, e-book, 2015)
 "All Souls Day" (Mark Sieber's Horror Drive-In exclusive Orangefield short story featuring original art by Keith Minnion)  (October 2009)
 Halloweenland (Leisure Books Mass Market Paperback 2007; Cemetery Dance limited edition hardcover, 2009; Crossroad Press e-book, 2012) - A novel length book that includes elements of The Baby and much more new material (the Leisure paperback also includes the original version of The Baby as a bonus).
 Horrorween (Leisure, 2006; Crossroad Press e-book, 2012) - A retelling of "Hornets," The Pumpkin Boy, and Orangefield.
 The Baby (Cemetery Dance Publications, 2006) - A limited edition novelette
 The Pumpkin Boy (Endeavor, 2005) - A limited edition novelette
 Hallows Eve (Leisure, 2004; Cemetery Dance Publications, 2006; Crossroad Press e-book, 2012)
 Orangefield (Cemetery Dance, 2002)
 "Hornets" (a short work that first appeared in Trick or Treat: A Collection of Halloween Novellas edited by Richard Chizmar) (Cemetery Dance, 2001)

The "Five Worlds" science fiction trilogy
 Return (ROC, 1997; Crossroad Press, 2012, e-book)
 Journey (ROC, 1997; Crossroad Press, 2012, e-book)
 Exile (ROC, 1996; Crossroad Press, 2012, e-book)

The "Masters of Mars" science fiction trilogy
 Masters of Mars (Science Fiction Book Club collection of all three titles in one hardcover, 2006; Crossroad Press, 2011, e-book)
 Queen of Mars (Ace, 2006; Crossroad Press, 2011, e-book)
 Sebastian of Mars (Ace, 2005; Crossroad Press, 2011, e-book)
 Haydn of Mars (Ace, 2005; Crossroad Press, 2011, e-book)

Babylon 5 series
 Babylon 5: Personal Agendas (Dell, 1997)

Short story collections
 Halloween and Other Seasons (Cemetery Dance, 2008; Crossroad Press, 2011, e-book). Includes:
"Summer"
"Sleepover"
"Eels"
"Letters From Camp"
"Roger in the Womb"
"The Return of Mad Santa"
"Baby Boss and the Underground Hamsters"
"Trail of the Chromium Bandits"
"The Man in the Other Car"
"Hedges"
"The Silly Stuff"
"The New Kid"
"Ahead of the Jonses"
"The Artist in the Small Room Above"
"The Dancing Foot"
"Liberty"
"Dust"
"The Pumpkin Boy"

 Hornets and Others (Cemetery Dance, 2005; Crossroad Press, 2011, e-book). Includes:
"The Ropy Thing"
"The Only"
"The Beat"
"In the Corn"
"Two"
"The Coat"
"The Haunting of Y-12"
"Billy the Fetus"
"Stars"
"Bags"
"The Red Wind"
"The Green Face"
"White Lightning"
"The Glass Man"
"Violets"
"The Quiet Ones"
"Hornets"

 A Little Yellow Book of Fevered Stories (Borderlands Press, 2004). Includes:
"Preface"
"Father Dear"
"The Ropy Thing"
"The Electric Fat Boy"
"Sleepover"
"In the Corn"
"Stars"
"The New Kid"
"Pumpkin Head"

 Toybox (Cemetery Dance, 1999; Leisure, 2003; Crossroad Press, 2011, e-book). Includes:
"Pumpkin Head"
"The Man With Legs"
"The Spook Man"
"Wish"
"Under My Bed"
"The Big House"
"Bogy"
"The Corn Dolly"
"The Electric Fat Boy"
"Snow"
"Garden of Eden"
"The Dust"
"Father Dear"
"Children of Cain"
"Red Eve"
"Pigs"
"Richard's Head"
"Boxes"

Anthologies containing stories by Sarrantonio
 Impossible Monsters, edited by Kasey Lansdale (Subterranean Press, 2013). Includes the Orangefield novelette "Orange Lake." 
 Retro-Pulp Tales, edited by Joe R. Lansdale (Subterranean Press, 2006). Includes the short story, "Summer."
 Midnight Premiere, edited by Tom Piccirilli (Cemetery Dance Publications 2007). Includes the short story, "Baby Boss and the Underground Hamsters."
 Stalkers, edited by Ed Gorman and Martin H. Greenberg. (Dark Harvest Books 1989). Includes the short story, "Children of Cain."
 Cemetery Dance: a Fifteen Year Celebration, edited by Richard Chizmar. (Cemetery Dance Publications, 2010).  May include the short story, "Landing Earl."
 Quietly Now (a tribute to Charles L. Grant), edited by Kealan Patrick Burke (Borderlands 2004). Includes the short story, "Dust."
 Trick or Treat: A Collection of Halloween Novellas edited by Richard Chizmar. (Cemetery Dance 2001). Includes the short story "Hornets"
 Shivers, edited by Richard Chizmar. (Cemetery Dance 2002). Includes the short story, "The Green Face."
 Shivers II, edited by Richard Chizmar (Cemetery Dance 2003). Includes the short story, "The New Kid."
 Shivers III, edited by Richard Chizmar (Cemetery Dance 2004). Includes the short story, "Hedges."
 Shivers IV, edited by Richard Chizmar (Cemetery Dance 2006). Includes the short story, "The Man in the Other Car."
 Shivers V, edited by Richard Chizmar (Cemetery Dance 2009). Includes the short story "Cookies."
 Shivers VI, edited by Richard Chizmar (Cemetery Dance 2010). Includes the short story "Last."
 The Ultimate Halloween, edited by Marvin Kaye. (I Books 2003). Includes the short story, "Pumpkin Head."
 Razored Saddles edited by Joe R. Lansdale and Pat LoBrutto. (Dark Harvest, 1989). Includes the short story, "Trail of the Chromium Bandits."
 Bruce Coville's Book of Spine Tinglers: Tales to Make You Shiver, edited by Bruce Coville (Apple Paperbacks 1996). Includes the short story, "Letters From Camp."
 The Mammoth Book of Comic Fantasy, edited by Mike Ashley. (Carroll & Graf Pub 1998). Includes the short story, "The Return of Mad Santa."
 Shadows 4 edited By Charles L. Grant. (Doubleday Science Fiction 1981). Includes the short story, "Under My Bed"
 Shadows 5 edited By Charles L. Grant. (Doubleday Science Fiction 1982). Includes the short story, "Boxes"
 Shadows 6 edited By Charles L. Grant. (Doubleday Science Fiction 1983). Includes the short story, "The Man With Legs"
 Shadows 8 edited By Charles L. Grant. (Doubleday Science Fiction 1985). Includes the short story, "Wish"
 Shadows 10 edited By Charles L. Grant. (Doubleday Science Fiction 1987). Includes the short story, "Pigs"
 Chrysalis 7, edited by Roy Torgeson (Doubleday, 1981). Contains the short story, "The Artist in the Small Room Above."
 Chrysalis 9, edited by Roy Torgeson (Doubleday, 1981). Contains the short story, "That They Be Saved."
 Weirdbook 18, published by W. Paul Ganley, 1983. Includes the short story "The Quiet Ones."
 Weirdbook 23/24, (Double issue) published by W. Paul Ganley, 1988. Includes the short story, "The Red Wind."

Books edited by Sarrantonio
 Portents - signed original anthology published in 2011.
 Stories - co-edited with Neil Gaiman. Published June 2010.
 Halloween: New Poems (anthology of original poems by Al Sarrantonio, James A. Moore, T. M. Wright, Joe R. Lansdale, Brian Freeman, Gary A. Braunbeck, and more) (May 2010, Cemetery Dance) 
 Flights: Extreme Visions of Fantasy (ROC, 2004). Includes his short story "Sleepover."
 Redshift: Extreme Visions of Speculative Fiction (ROC, 2001)
 999: New Stories of Horror and Suspense (Avon, 1999; Perennial, 2001)
 100 Hair-Raising Little Horror Stories (with Martin H. Greenberg, Barnes & Noble, 1993)
 The National Lampoon Treasury of Humor (Fireside/Simon & Schuster, 1991)
 The Fireside Treasury of New Humor (Fireside/Simon & Schuster, 1989)
 The Fireside Treasury of Great Humor (Fireside/Simon & Schuster, 1987)

Magazine appearances
 Cemetery Dance, #46. Features the short story "Eels."
 Cemetery Dance, #35, 2001. Features the short story "Violets."
 Cemetery Dance, #22 Winter 1995 (Volume Six, Issue Four). Features the short story "Garden of Eden."
 Cemetery Dance, #4 Spring 1990 (Volume 2 issue 2). Features the short story "The Meek."
 Spiderwebs, Volume 1, Number 2; Spring 1982. Contains the short story "Sherlocks."
 Fantasy Book, #3; February 1982. Contains the short story "The Return of Mad Santa."
 Analog Science Fiction and Fact Volume 101 #13; December 1981. Features the short story "There is a Home."
 Heavy Metal May 1979. Features the short story "Roger in the Womb."
 Isaac Asimov's Science Fiction Magazine Volume 3 #3; March 1979. Features the short story "Ahead of the Joneses."

Comic book adaptations
 Cemetery Dance Presents: Grave Tales issue #2 (May 2000). Features "The Corn Dolly" adapted by Glenn Chadbourne.
 Weird Business edited by Joe R. Lansdale and Richard Klaw (1995).  Features "The Man with Legs."

External links
  Robert McCammon interview
  Cemetery Dance Publications
  HarperCollins Publishers

1952 births
Living people
20th-century American novelists
21st-century American novelists
American horror writers
American male novelists
American mystery writers
American science fiction writers
American people of Scotch-Irish descent
American writers of Italian descent
People from Long Island
Writers from New York City
Western (genre) writers
Manhattan College alumni
American male short story writers
20th-century American short story writers
21st-century American short story writers
20th-century American male writers
21st-century American male writers
Novelists from New York (state)